Abbas al-Fadini is a member of the Parliament of Sudan and of the Forum of African and Arab Parliamentarians on Population and Development.

On 10 June 2008 he survived the fire of Sudan Airways Flight 109.

References

Year of birth missing (living people)
Living people
Survivors of aviation accidents or incidents
Members of the National Assembly (Sudan)